Lorraine Rita Bird (born 12 February 1942) is a former Australian politician.

Bird worked as an antiques dealer and community development worker, and joined the Labor Party in 1979. In 1985 she was elected to Pioneer Shire Council (serving until 1991), and in 1989 was elected to the Queensland Legislative Assembly as the Labor member for Whitsunday. In February 1996 she was appointed Shadow Minister for Tourism, and she was shuffled to Shadow Minister for Public Works and Administrative Services in December 1996 before leaving the front bench in August 1997. In 1998 she was defeated by a One Nation candidate.

References

1942 births
Living people
Members of the Queensland Legislative Assembly
Queensland local councillors
Place of birth missing (living people)
Australian Labor Party members of the Parliament of Queensland
Women members of the Queensland Legislative Assembly
Women local councillors in Australia